Statistics of the Mexican Primera División for the 1985–86 season.

Prode-1985

Overview
It was contested by 20 teams, and América won the championship.

Irapuato F.C. was promoted from Segunda División.

Teams

Group stage

Group 1

Group 2

Group 3

Group 4

Playoff

Mexico-1986

Overview
It was contested by 20 teams, and Monterrey won the championship.

Group stage

Group 1

Group 2

Playoff

References
Mexico - List of final tables (RSSSF)

Liga MX seasons
Mex
1985–86 in Mexican football